The Myanmar brown leaf turtle (Cyclemys fusca) is a species of Asian leaf turtle found in Myanmar.

Description
Its carapace is dark brown, ovoid, and lacks patterns in adults. The plastron is dark brown to black with or without dense, black, radiating lines. The head is greenish yellow. The throat and neck are uniformly dark. The bridge is dark brown to black.

Distribution 
Myanmar brown leaf turtle is widespread in Myanmar, and perhaps occurs in adjacent India and Bangladesh.

See also
Cyclemys

References 

Cyclemys
Turtles of Asia
Reptiles of Myanmar
Endemic fauna of Myanmar
Reptiles described in 2008